Elmar Fischer (6 October 1936 – 19 January 2022) was an Austrian Roman Catholic prelate.

Fischer was born in Feldkirch, Vorarlberg, Austria. He was ordained to the priesthood in 1961 for the Roman Catholic Diocese of Feldkirch, Austria. He served as the bishop of the diocese from 2005 until his retirement in 2011. 

He died from COVID-19 in Feldkirch, Vorarlberg, on 19 January 2022, at the age of 85.

References

1936 births
2022 deaths
21st-century Roman Catholic bishops in Austria
Deaths from the COVID-19 pandemic in Austria
Bishops appointed by Pope Benedict XVI
People from Feldkirch, Vorarlberg
University of Innsbruck alumni